Training Center XML (TCX) is a data exchange format introduced in 2007 as part of Garmin's Training Center product.  The XML is similar to GPX since it exchanges GPS tracks, but treats a track as an Activity rather than simply a series of GPS points.  TCX provides standards for transferring heart rate, running cadence, bicycle cadence, calories in the detailed track.  It also provides summary data in the form of laps.

Its Internet media type is application/vnd.garmin.tcx+xml for php the media type is application/octet-stream

External links

XML Schemas 
 Garmin's Training Center Database XML (TCX) Schema
 User profile extension Schema
 Activity extension Schema

Tools 
 Sport distance calculator Edit and export TCX files from Google Maps
 Add Virtual Partner Pace Modify an existing TCX file with you own Virtual Partner pace
 Tcx Viewer 

Garmin